Ten Mile Point may refer to the following:

 Ten Mile Point, British Columbia, a residential neighbourhood in Greater Victoria, British Columbia, Canada
 Ten Mile Point, New York, an area on the shore of Skaneateles Lake, New York, USA
 Ten Mile Point, Ontario, an area on Manitoulin Island near Little Current, in Ontario, Canada